Xenomigia noctipenna is a moth of the family Notodontidae. It is found in north-eastern Ecuador.

The length of the forewings is 15.5-17.5 mm. The ground colour of the forewings is dark chocolate brown, the veins thinly lined with orange. The hindwings are translucent grey-brown, becoming darker toward the outer margin.

The larvae have been reared on Chusquea cf. scandens.

Etymology
The species name is derived from Latin noctis (meaning night) and penna (meaning feather or wing) and refers to the dark brown, sparsely patterned forewings.

References

Moths described in 2011
Notodontidae of South America